Shafiqur Rahman is a Bangladeshi politician, physician and current amir of Bangladesh Jamaat-e-Islami. He served as Jamaat's secretary general from October 2016 to November 2019. He was elected the Jamaat-e-Islami Emir on November 12, 2019.  He was former acting secretary general of the party. Before his being acting secretary general, he had been Ameer (leader) of the Sylhet city branch of the party.

Primary life 
Shafiqur Rahman was born on October 31, 1958 at Vatera Union under Kulaura Upazila of Moulvibazar District. His father's name Abru Mia and mother's name is Khatibun. He is the third of son his family. Rahman passed the SSC from the local Baramachal High School in 1974 and then passed the HSC from the MC College in Sylhet in 1976. He got his MBBS degree from Sylhet Medical College in 1983.

Career 
Rahman started his political life through the Jasad Chhatra League in 1973. He Joined Bangladesh Islami Chhatra Shibir in 1977. While studying in Sylhet Osmani Medical College, he became president of the Chatra Shibir medical branch and later the Sylhet District branch. In 1984, joined the Jamaat-e-Islami. Later he served as Sylhet's Emir. After taking office at the central level as Assistant Secretary General in 2010,  and the first acting Secretary General on September 19, 2011, he took over as Secretary General in 2016.

Personal life 
Rahman was married on January 5, 1985 to Dr. Ameena Begum. Amena Begum served as the Member of parliament for the reserved seats in the eighth Jatiyo Sangshad election. The couple has 2 daughters and 1 son.

References 

Living people
Bangladesh Jamaat-e-Islami politicians
Bangladeshi Islamists
People from Kulaura Upazila
1958 births
Murari Chand College alumni
Sylhet MAG Osmani Medical College alumni
21st-century Bengalis
20th-century Bengalis